Events in the year 2017 in Iceland.

Incumbents
 President: Guðni Th. Jóhannesson
 Prime Minister: Sigurður Ingi Jóhannsson (until 11 January); Bjarni Benediktsson (11 January to 30 November); Katrín Jakobsdóttir (Starting 30 November)

Events
11 January – Bjarni Benediktsson takes over as prime minister.
15 September - Protests in Iceland occur over a scandal involving an undisclosed letter sent by Prime Minister Bjarni Benediktsson to pardon a criminal. Amid backlash, he calls for snap elections to be held on 28 October.
28 October - Snap elections are held just one year after the previous ones. 
30 November - After a month of trying to form coalitions between parties, Katrín Jakobsdóttir becomes the Prime Minister of Iceland.

Deaths

30 January – Eiður Svanberg Guðnason, politician (b. 1939).
8 February – Ólöf Nordal, Icelandic politician, Minister of the Interior 2014–2017 (b. 1966; cancer)
27 February – Jórunn Viðar, pianist and composer (b. 1918).
1 July – Orri Vigfússon, entrepreneur and environmentalist (b. 1942)

References

 
2010s in Iceland
Years of the 21st century in Iceland
Iceland
Iceland